Peshkabad (also Romanized as Peshkābād; also known as Jaʿfarābād, Beshekābād, Beskekābād, Pīshak Ābād, Pīshekābād, and Pīshokābād) is a village in Bampur-e Gharbi Rural District, in the Central District of Bampur County, Sistan and Baluchestan Province, Iran. At the 2006 census, its population was 2,588, in 495 families.

References 

Populated places in Bampur County